Gol-e Zard (also Romanized as Gol-e Zard and Gol Zard; also known as Sang-e Sefīd) is a village in Kamal Rud Rural District, Qolqol Rud District, Tuyserkan County, Hamadan Province, Iran. At the 2006 census, its population was 103, in 29 families.

References 

Populated places in Tuyserkan County